"Chug-a-Lug" is a song written and recorded by American country music artist Roger Miller. The song reached number 9 on the US Billboard Hot 100 in 1964, becoming his second pop hit.

Content
The song is a humorous reminiscence of youthful encounters with homemade alcoholic beverages. The expression "chug-a-lug" refers to quickly downing a drink, and the lyrics describe the singer's reaction to the extra-strong liquor. Example: "I swallered it with a smile / (sound of swallowing) / I run ten mile! Chug-a-lug, chug-a-lug / Makes you want to holler, 'Hi-dee-ho!' / Burns your tummy, don't ya know / Chug-a-lug, chug-a-lug."

History
By July 1964, Roger Miller's monster hit "Dang Me" had run its course in radio, and "Chug-a-Lug" was hitting hard and fast. Concerned about offending their core country audience, Miller and his producer Jerry Kennedy had initially resisted releasing "Chug-a-Lug" as a single, and an alternate version of the song was produced with the word "wine" edited out. But head of Smash Records Charles Fach knew that Miller's ode to forbidden liquid pleasures would be a hit. Of the song’s success, Kennedy said: "Charles was the one who wanted 'Chug-a-Lug’, we didn't know he was testing this thing in places. He said, “The college crowd is eating up this ‘Chug-a-Lug’”. And I said, “Well, we've got our country fans to consider here.” And fortunately they loved it too."

Miller said that the song was based on a true story of a friend of his who "could drink a beer in 3 seconds".

Chart performance

Cover versions
The British group The Swinging Blue Jeans included the song on their 1966 Canada Capitol album Don't Make Me Over.
The song was recorded on the Kentucky Headhunters' 2005 album Big Boss Man.
This song was re-worded and used for the theme of the Hey Hey It's Saturday segment Plucka Duck.
Country singer Toby Keith included a live version on the deluxe edition of his 2010 album Bullets in the Gun.
A reworded version was used in animated advertisements for "Milk Chug" single-serving milk bottles.

References

5. https://www.rogermiller.com/bio2.html

1964 singles
Roger Miller songs
The Kentucky Headhunters songs
Songs written by Roger Miller
Songs about alcohol
1964 songs
Mercury Records singles
Song recordings produced by Jerry Kennedy